The Screen Actors Guild Award for Outstanding Performance by a Male Actor in a Supporting Role in a Motion Picture is an award given by the Screen Actors Guild to honor the finest acting achievements in film.

Winners and nominees

Legend:

1990s

2000s

2010s

2020s

Superlatives

Multiple winners
Two awards
 Mahershala Ali (Moonlight (2016), Green Book (2018))

Multiple nominees
Note: Winners are indicated in bold type.

Two nominations
 Mahershala Ali (Moonlight (2016), Green Book (2018))
 Alan Arkin (Little Miss Sunshine (2006), Argo (2012))
 Christian Bale (The Fighter (2010), The Big Short (2015))
 Javier Bardem (No Country for Old Men (2007), Skyfall (2012))
 Kenneth Branagh (Othello (1995), My Week With Marilyn (2011))
 Jeff Bridges (The Contender (2000), Hell or High Water (2016))
 Don Cheadle (Devil in a Blue Dress (1995), Crash (2005))
 Willem Dafoe (Shadow of the Vampire (2000), The Florida Project (2017))
 Robert Duvall (A Civil Action (1998), The Judge (2014))
 Jaime Foxx (Collateral (2004), Just Mercy (2019))
 Woody Harrelson (The Messenger (2009), Three Billboards Outside Ebbing, Missouri (2017))
 Ed Harris (Apollo 13 (1995), The Hours (2002))
 Ethan Hawke (Training Day (2001), Boyhood (2014))
 Philip Seymour Hoffman (Doubt (2008), The Master (2012))
 Tommy Lee Jones (No Country for Old Men (2007), Lincoln (2012))
 Dev Patel (Slumdog Millionaire (2008), Lion (2016))
 Christopher Plummer (The Last Station (2009), Beginners (2011))
 Mark Ruffalo (The Kids Are All Right  (2010), Foxcatcher (2014))
 Geoffrey Rush (Shakespeare in Love (1998), The King's Speech (2010))

Three nominations
 Chris Cooper (American Beauty (1999), Adaptation. (2002), Seabiscuit (2003))
 Jared Leto (Dallas Buyers Club (2013), The Little Things (2020), House of Gucci (2021))

See also
 Academy Award for Best Supporting Actor
 BAFTA Award for Best Actor in a Supporting Role
 Independent Spirit Award for Best Supporting Male
 Critics' Choice Movie Award for Best Supporting Actor
 Golden Globe Award for Best Supporting Actor – Motion Picture

External links
 SAG Awards official site

Male Actor Supporting Role
 
Film awards for supporting actor